Manuel Mora Valverde (27 August 1909 – 29 December 1994) was a communist and labor leader in Costa Rica. He was born in San José and helped to found the Workers and Farmers Party (later the People's Vanguard Party) in 1931. For his contributions to the labor movement and to the institution of a welfare state, Mora was awarded the title Benemérito de la Patria by the Legislative Assembly.

See also
 Social Guarantees

External links 
  A short biography

1909 births
1994 deaths
People from San José, Costa Rica
Costa Rican people of Spanish descent
People's Vanguard Party (Costa Rica) politicians
People of the Costa Rican Civil War
Costa Rican revolutionaries
Costa Rican atheists